The Journal of Molecular Neuroscience is a peer-reviewed scientific journal covering research in neuroscience. It is published by Humana Press and the editor-in-chief is Illana Gozes. In 1999, the journal absorbed Molecular and Chemical Neuropathology, a journal that had been established in 1983 as Neurochemical Pathology. According to the Journal Citation Reports, the journal has a 2020 impact factor of 3.444.

References

External links 
 

Publications established in 1989
Neuroscience journals
Springer Science+Business Media academic journals
Publications established in 1983
Publications disestablished in 1998
English-language journals
9 times per year journals